Nizhnesoinsky is a rural locality (a khutor) in Rossoshinskoye Rural Settlement, Uryupinsky District, Volgograd Oblast, Russia. The population was 31 as of 2010.

Geography 
Nizhnesoinsky is located 32 km southwest of Uryupinsk (the district's administrative centre) by road. Rossoshinsky is the nearest rural locality.

References 

Rural localities in Uryupinsky District